Thirumudivakkam is a south-western suburb of Chennai metropolitan city, Tamil Nadu. This area belongs to Sriperumbudur taluk, Kanchipuram district.

It holds an industrial estate with around 350 MSME companies with varied production units supporting Automobile companies and many other at Sriperumbudur, Oragadam Industrial corridor and so on. Employers and employees are joining hands together for the upliftment of the nation economy through production. Greenery is the vision of Thirumudivakkam industrial estate.

Tamil Nadu Government State Esi dispensary was established recently on 2 July 2019 for the well-being of the employees and their Families.

Thiruneermalai Perumal temple (one among the 108 Dhivyasthalam) is situated very near (6 km) by to this place.
Kundrathur is located around 3 KM away from Thirumudivakkam.

Demographics
According to 2011 Census of India, the total population of this village is 4083. The literacy rate of this village is 78.21%.

References

Neighbourhoods in Chennai